Barásoain Church (official title: Our Lady of Mount Carmel Parish) is a Roman Catholic church built in 1888 in Malolos, Bulacan. It is about 42 kilometers from Manila. Having earned the title as the "Cradle of Democracy in the East, the most important religious building in the Philippines", and the site of the First Philippine Republic, the church is proverbial for its historical importance among Filipinos.

Etymology 
The name "Barásoain" was derived from Barásoain in Navarre, Spain, which the missionaries found to be strikingly similar to the place in Malolos. When the Philippine Revolution broke out, Spanish authorities coined the term "barás ng suwaíl“ (Tagalog, “dungeon of the defiant”) because the church was a meeting-place for anti-Spanish and anti-colonial illustrados.

History 

Barásoain was originally known as "Bangkál“, a part of Encomienda of Malolos integrated by Miguel López  de Legaspi with the town of Calumpit to the west on April 5, 1572. When the Augustinian friars made Malolos a separate town in 1580, Bangkál became a villages under the jurisdiction of the town church. A hermitage made of nipa and bamboo was constructed near the river between Maluslos (Malolos población) and Barasoain for the people of Bangkál. In that same year, Malolos Curate and Vicar Forane Fray Agustín Carreno, OSA established the first chapel at the old Ermita of the old Cemetery of Malolos. Abandoned in 1680, it served as the temporary chapel-of-ease of Barásoain, located in front of the Casa Tribunal (Presidencia), which is now commonly called Casa Real de Malolos. A fire in the 17th century destroyed the new church.

Another church building was commissioned and constructed on a new site, its present location—corner of Paseo del Congreso and Antonio Bautista streets. Under the supervision of Rev. Fr. Francisco Royo, O.S.A., the new church was built, made of light materials. In 1884, during the celebration of the Flores de Mayo the temporary church was burned.

From 1630 to 1859, priests serving in Barásoain were from the nearby mother church of the town, the Parroquia de la Inmaculada Concepción de Malolos. Since the formal establishment of Barásoain as an independent parish to Malolos Church in 1859, several priests were assigned by the Augustinian Order, and later by the Archdiocese of Manila and Diocese of Malolos.

Separation of Barásoain and construction of the church 
In 1859, Barásoain was separated from Malolos. As a new town and parish, the Our Lady of Mount Carmel was chosen to be its patroness. Fr. Francisco Arriola was appointed first parish priest on June 1, 1859, and he built the convent. A small ermita, constructed by Fr. Melchor Fernández in 1816 while he was parish priest of Malolos (1816–1840), served as the temporary parish church. One of the existing bells bears the year 1870. It was installed by Fr. Emterio Ruperez, and it was donated by the “principalía (sic) of Malolos.” The bell was also dedicated to the Our Lady of Mount Carmel of Barásoain. Fr. Francisco Royo replaced the temporary chapel with a hewn stone church built between 1871 and 1878. This was soon destroyed by fire. The only remnant of this church is one of its bells, installed by Fr. Royo in 1873 and dedicated to Saint Francis Xavier. Fr. Juan Girón, who succeeded him, used the chapel of the cemetery until this one, too, was destroyed by the earthquakes of 1880. Fr. Girón then built temporary chapel of nipa and bamboo which was burned down in 1884, during the solemn celebrations of the feast of Our Lady of Mount Carmel.

In 1885, Fr. Girón hired contractor Miguel Magpayo and began construction of a massive church made of masonry and bricks. The church was completed under Fr. Girón’s supervision. Jorde does not specify the year of its completion; he says only that, “at the time it was completed the pockets of Fr. Girón were drained.” 

In 1889, Fr. Martín Arconada started construction of the belfry and the restoration of the convent. Three bells were installed in 1897. One of them is dedicated to Saint Martin, Bishop, donated by Fr. Martín Arconada. In 1894, Fr. Miguel de Vera undertook another restoration of the convent.

Philippine Revolution and the Malolos Congress 
As tensions were brewing between the Filipino revolutionaries and the Americans who have arrived in the country in the wake of the Spanish–American War, the Philippine Revolutionary Government under the leadership of Emilio Aguinaldo decided to move the capital north from Cavite to Malolos in Bulacan. Plans were made to write a new constitution for the soon to be proclaimed Philippine Republic; Barásoain Church was chosen to be the site of the First Philippine Congress, otherwise known as the Malolos Congress, which convened on September 15, 1898 to draft what would become the Malolos Constitution.

On January 21, 1899, the Malolos Constitution was ratified. This paved way for the formal inauguration of the First Philippine Republic on January 23, 1899) with Emilio Aguinaldo taking oath as president. But the outbreak of the Philippine-American War on February 4 brought the Republic into crisis. The Malolos Congress held its last session on the last week of February as the Aguinaldo government evacuated from Malolos and transferred the capital to Nueva Ecija.

On March 31, 1899, the American forces captured Malolos and Barásoain, which were placed under American control.

Reunification with Malolos and subsequent events 

In 1903, the town of Barásoain was dissolved and annexed to Malolos.

By Presidential Decree No. 260, Barásoain Church was proclaimed as a National Shrine by President Ferdinand Marcos on August 1, 1973. A museum was opened at the old convent of the church which is being managed by the National Historical Commission of the Philippines.

In the wake of the 1998 Philippine Centennial celebrations, the church became the venue for the inauguration of Joseph Estrada on June 30, 1998.

Philippine Bill Issue
The image of the church has been depicted in certain monetary bills until 2001, namely the English series one peso bill and the Pilipino, Ang Bagong Lipunan, and both the 1985 and 1997 New Design series ten peso bill together with an image of Apolinario Mabini (Andrés Bonifacio on the 1997 version) on the other side. However, it was replaced by a ten-peso coin without the representation of the church. In 2009, local priests and Laban ng Bulacan movement officials, led by their chairman John Paul Albert Limpo, initiated a signature campaign to appeal to the Philippine Bangko Sentral restoring at least the image of the church in any present Philippine bill.

After three years of petition and nine years since the last printing of the ten peso bill in 2001, in December 2010, upon the issuance of the "New Generation Currency" series for Philippine banknotes, Barásoain Church was featured again, this time in the 200-peso denomination until 2017 when it was replaced with the scene of the opening of the Malolos Congress.

List of Parish Priests & Rectors

Gallery

References

External links

 

Roman Catholic churches completed in 1878
National Historical Landmarks of the Philippines
Buildings and structures in Malolos
Roman Catholic churches in Bulacan
19th-century Roman Catholic church buildings in the Philippines
Churches in the Roman Catholic Diocese of Malolos